The men's individual recurve competition at the 2011 World Archery Championships took place on 5–10 July 2011 in Torino, Italy. It marked the first World Championships where the Archery Olympic Round, introduced in 2010, was used for the recurve elimination rounds. 199 archers competed in the qualification round on 5 July; the top 104 archers qualified for the knockout tournament on 7–8 July, with the semi-finals and finals on 10 July. The tournament doubled as the principal qualification tournament for the 2012 Olympics.

Third seed Kim Woo-jin won the men's individual competition, defeating fellow Korean Oh Jin-hyek in the final in four sets.

Seeds
As well as securing qualification for the 2012 Olympics, the top eight scorers in the qualifying round were seeded, and received byes to the third round.

Draw

Top half

Section 1

Section 2

Section 3

Section 4

Bottom half

Section 5

Section 6

Section 7

Section 8

Finals

References

2011 World Archery Championships